This is a list of the busiest railway stations in West Yorkshire

See also
 List of busiest railway stations in North Yorkshire

 
Busiest railway stations in West Yorkshire